The  subserosa or tela subserosa, is a thin layer of tissue in the walls of various organs. It is a layer of connective tissue (usually of the areolar type) between the muscular layer (muscularis externa) and the serosa (serous membrane).

The subserosa has clinical importance particularly in cancer staging (for example, in staging stomach cancer or uterine cancer).

The subserosa (sub- + serosa) is to a serous membrane what the submucosa (sub- + mucosa) is to a mucous membrane.

References

External links
  - "Female Reproductive System: oviduct; infundibulum"
 Histology at uio.no
 Diagram at uniklinik-saarland.de

Membrane biology